Hjalmar V. Pohjanheimo (22 December 1867, in Jyväskylä – 20 August 1936, in Helsinki) was a Finnish film producer and director. Pohjanheimo also owned a number of movie theaters in Finland.

There were 25 films produced during the period of Finnish autonomy, Pohjanheimo produced 15 of these.

Pohjanheimo, who began his career as a businessman and sawmill in the timber industry, moved into the film industry in 1910 after moving to Helsinki with his family. He owned the Lyyra cinema chain in the 1910s and also owned a film production company called Lyyra Filmi, founded in 1911. Pohjanheimo's Lyyra company had several cinemas all over Finland, all of which were called Lyyra, and they were separated by Roman numerals. One of them operated on Yrjönkatu in Helsinki on the same site as the Edison cinema.

Pohjanheimo bought the feature film Sylvi, shot in 1911, for FIM 4,500 from the filmmaker trio Teuvo Puro, Teppo Raikka and Frans Engström.  The film premiered at the Lyyra Theater in Vyborg on February 24, 1913, and was shown in theaters all over Finland during the same year. The success of the film with the public made Pohjanheimo also start producing films himself. In 1913–1914, theater director and actor Kaarle Halme directed four feature films for Lyyra Film (Young Pilot, Bloodless, Summer, On Foreign Ground), which also involved a theater company led by Halme. The other  films which Pohjanheimo made were mainly light farce short films, and undercover police adventure Secret Inheritance Order in 1914, produced together with his sons Adolf Pohjanheimo (1888–1958), Hilarius Pohjanheimo (1892–1932), Asser Pohjanheimo (1893–1937) and Birger Pohjanheimo (1895–1936).

In total, Pohjanheimo produced as many as 15 of the 25 Finnish feature films during the period of autonomy. In 1914, Pohjanheimo began producing the first Finnish weekly news review films under the name Lyyran Viikkolehti.

In 1913-15, Pohjanheimo produced a total of 14 feature films of various runtimes.  After World War II, Pohjanheimo produced three more short farcees in 1920-21, which he himself directed.  Actor Väinö Lehmus was the male lead in all of them.

Pohjanheimo moved out of the film industry in 1922, when he sold his remaining theaters.  He owned the Kyyhkylä manor in the rural municipality of Mikkeli and after that he owned the Numlahti manor in Nurmijärvi in 1922-1930.  Pohjanheimo lost his property during the years of scarcity in the 1930s, and for the last years he worked as a log dealer in Tapanila, a rural area in Helsinki.  He died destitute in 1936.

Filmography

As producer

Kosto on suloista. 1913
Nuori luotsi. 1913
Verettömät. 1913
Vieraalla maaperällä.  1914
Käpäsen rakkausseikkailu.  1914
Nainen jonkas minulle annoit.  1914
Salainen perintömääräys. 1914
Se kolmas.  1914
Kaksi sankaria.  1914
Pirteä ja kadonnut kori.  1914
Tuiskusen kuherruskuukausi.  1914
Väärennetty osoite.  1914
Rikosten runtelema.  1915
Kesä.  1915
Kilu-Kallen ja Mouku-Franssin kosioretki.  1920
Sunnuntaimetsästäjät.  1921
Kun solttu-Juusosta tuli herra.  1921

As director

Kosto on suloista. 1913
Kilu-Kallen ja Mouku-Franssin kosioretki.  1920
Sunnuntaimetsästäjät.  1921
Kun solttu-Juusosta tuli herra.  1921

References

1867 births
1936 deaths
People from Jyväskylä
People from Vaasa Province (Grand Duchy of Finland)
Finnish film directors
Finnish film producers